The San Juan Ixhuatepec explosions of 1984, also known as the San Juanico disaster, was an industrial disaster caused by a series of explosions at a liquefied petroleum gas (LPG) tank farm in San Juan Ixhuatepec, Tlalnepantla de Baz, State of Mexico on 19 November 1984. The explosions destroyed the facility and devastated the town of San Juan Ixhuatepec, part of Greater Mexico City, with 500–600 victims killed, and 5000–7000 suffering severe burns. The disaster was one of the deadliest industrial disasters in world history.

Facility
The incident took place at a storage and distribution facility (a "terminal") for liquified petroleum gas (LPG) belonging to the state-owned oil company Pemex. The facility consisted of 54 LPG storage tanks; 6 large spherical tanks (four holding  and two holding ) and 48 smaller horizontal bullet-shaped tanks of various sizes. Together, the tanks contained  of a propane/butane mixture at the time of the accident, representing one third of Mexico City's entire liquid petroleum gas supply.

The disaster

Origin 
The disaster was initiated by a gas leak on the site, likely caused by a pipe rupture during transfer operations, which caused a plume of LPG to concentrate at ground level for 10 minutes. The plume eventually grew large enough to drift on the wind towards the west end of the site, where the facility's waste-gas flare pit was located.

Fire and explosions 
At 5:40 a.m., the cloud reached the flare and ignited, resulting in a vapor cloud explosion that severely damaged the tank farm and resulted in a massive conflagration fed by the LPG leaking from newly damaged tanks. Just four minutes later, at 5:44 a.m., the first tank underwent a BLEVE (Boiling Liquid/Expanding Vapor Explosion). Over the next hour, 12 separate BLEVE explosions were recorded. The fire and smaller explosions continued until 10 a.m. the next morning. It is believed that the escalation was caused by an ineffective gas detection system.

Casualties
The town of San Juan Ixhuatepec surrounded the facility and consisted of 40,000 residents, with an additional 61,000 more living in surrounding communities. The explosion shock wave destroyed a range of 5 to 7 kilometer of houses and businesses at various levels. Windows were found destroyed at 10 km due to the blast wave. Much of the town was destroyed by the explosions and ensuing fire, with the current statistics indicating 500 to 600 deaths, and 5,000–7,000 severe injuries. Radiant heat generated by the fire incinerated most corpses to ashes, with only 2% of the recovered remains left in recognizable condition.

The disaster was detrimental to the ruling Institutional Revolutionary Party (PRI), as inadequately maintained Pemex infrastructure was identified as responsible for the explosions, although the events would in part be overshadowed by the 1985 Mexico City earthquake.

See also 

 List of industrial disasters

References

External links 
Explosiones en San Juanico - YouTube video on the disaster showing casualty response, burning LPG spherical tanks, among other things
PEMEX LPG Terminal, Mexico City, Mexico. 19 November 1984 - Health and Safety Executive
Universidad de Zaragoza - Reporte de Accidente de San Juan Ixhuatepec 
Protección Civil Anda Lucia - Datos sobre la explosión de San Juanico

Industrial fires and explosions in Mexico
Gas explosions
1984 in Mexico
Tlalnepantla de Baz
Explosions in 1984
November 1984 events in Mexico
1984 disasters in Mexico